Mink Trapping is an American book that details tips on how to trap animals. It was published on August 6, 1906.

Summary 
One of Harding's Pleasure & Profit Books, a collection of mink trapping instructions and tips from the author and other trappers in the United States and Canada, including photographs and illustrations.

The book gives information on where and how to set for mink, including land, water, blind sets, baits and scent to use, methods in Northern and Southern states, size and care of skins.

Excerpts and illustrations

Chapter 2, Mink And Their Habits, page 23 
"I have had a world of experience trapping but very limited at catching, says an Arkansas trapper, yet plenty of both to be fully capable of solving the question as to whether or not mink are afraid of the scent of iron. It is simply this. Some mink are positively afraid of it and some are positively not so."

Chapter 14, Many Good Methods, page 113 
"The mink is very cunning and hard to catch in a steel trap unless you know how and where to set, which is about the only secret there is in catching mink. I have had people write to know what scent I used and how I set traps. A man can learn better methods as long as he traps—experience is the best teacher and unless he is willing to work hard he will never make a successful trapper of any kind of game." – Moses Bone

Chapters (First Edition 1906) 

1. General Information
2. Mink and Their Habits
3. Size and Care of Skins
4. Good and Lasting Baits
5. Bait and Scent
6. Places to Set
7. Indian Methods
8. Mink Trapping on the Prairie
9. Southern Methods
10. Northern Methods
11. Unusual Ways
12. Illinois Trapper's Method
13. Experienced Trapper's Ways
14. Many Good Methods
15. Salt Set
16. Log and Other Sets
17. Points for the Young Trapper
18. Proper Size Traps
19. Deadfalls
20. Steel Traps

Review

Hunter-Trader-Trapper Magazine, Vol 15, No. 1, Oct 1907 

MINK TRAPPING – While this book has only been upon the market about one year the first edition is nearly sold and the second is being printed and bound.  While this book contains less than 200 pages 5x7 inches it is by far the best book for mink trappers ever produced.  The author in his introduction says:  "While there are some excellent mink trappers no one man has studied out all the methods, for the conditions under which the trapper in the South makes his largest catches would probably be of little to the trapper of the Far North, where snow covers the ground the greater part of year.  Conditions along the Atlantic are than the Pacific, and as well the used by thousands of trappers along Mississippi and its tributaries differ the Eastern or Western Coast trapper, for the mink's food is not the same along fresh inland waters as the coast or salt water.  The methods published are from all of the country, and many experienced trappers tell of their best methods, so that it makes no difference in what part of you live, something will be found of to trap in your section. Most of the articles are taken from those published in the H-T-T with slight correction."

Publication 

First published by A. R. Harding Publishing Company, Columbus, Ohio, August 6, 1906 (copyright), later editions are currently available in hardcover and paperback.

References

External links 
Internet Archive – Mink Trapping by A. R. Harding, scanned image
Project Gutenberg – Mink Trapping by Arthur Robert Harding, free eBook
Fur-Fish-Game, Mink Trapping by A. R. Harding, paperback
Amazon.com – Mink Trapping by A. R. Harding, various editions

Animal trapping
Fur trade
Hunting
1906 non-fiction books